Blue Velvet may refer to:

 "Blue Velvet" (song), a 1950 popular song made famous by Bobby Vinton
 Blue Velvet, a 1963 album by Bobby Vinton originally released as Blue on Blue
 Blue Velvet (film), a 1986 film by David Lynch
 Blue Velvet (soundtrack), a soundtrack by Angelo Badalamenti for the 1986 film
 Blue Velvet (The Clovers album), a 1946 album by The Clovers
 Blue Velvet (Houston Person album), a 2001 album by Houston Person
 "Blue Velvet" (Shizuka Kudō song), a 1997 song by Shizuka Kudō
 Blue Velvet, a Japanese musical duo featuring Ayana and Shūichi Aoki
 Blue Velvet (digital project), an online history project about New Orleans and Hurricane Katrina
 Blue Velvet, a mixture of morphine and tripelennamine

See also 
 Creedence Clearwater Revival, originally known as The Blue Velvets
 Paraglyphidodon oxyodon, commonly known as the Blue Velvet Damselfish
 Terana caerulea, commonly known as the Velvet Blue Spread